The Veladero mine is a gold mine in Argentina. The mine is located in the north-western part of Argentina in San Juan Province. The mine has estimated reserves of 10 million oz of gold. It is operated by Barrick Gold.The mine uses heap leach to extract gold and silver, which is a process that uses cyanide to dissolve the gold and mercury to extract it from the cyanide slurry. This mine has had at least 5 catastrophic spills i tor eh environment contaminating 5 rivers. 

In 2007, Barrick Gold installed the world's highest-altitude wind turbine at the Veladero mine at nearly 4,200m elevation.

References 

Gold mines in Argentina
Mines in San Juan Province, Argentina
Barrick Gold